The following is a list of winners and shortlisted works of the Otherwise Award, an annual literary prize for works of science fiction or fantasy that expand or explore one's understanding of gender. It was initiated (as the James Tiptree Jr. Award) in February 1991 by science fiction authors Pat Murphy and Karen Joy Fowler, and is awarded and discussed yearly at WisCon. The name of the award was changed to its current form in October 2019.

The judges also announce an Honor List each year.

Winners and Honor List 
Winning titles are marked by a blue background.

References 

 
Fantasy awards
Awards established in 1991
Science fiction awards
Speculative fiction writers by award
American speculative fiction awards
Lists of speculative fiction-related award winners and nominees

de:James Tiptree, Jr. Award
fr:Prix James Tiptree, Jr.
ja:ジェイムズ・ティプトリー・ジュニア賞
pl:Nagroda Jamesa Tiptree, Jr
ru:Премия Джеймса Типтри-младшего
sv:James Tiptree, Jr.-priset